Zomi nationalism is an independence movement in Chin State, Myanmar.

History 

The British entered Zogam in 1777 and began colonial administration in 1890. In 1892 the British called the Chin-Lushai conference for the Chin and the Lushai, both hill tribes. The British favoured uniting the Chin and Lushai into one administration, but the Lushai rejected the plan. The Lushai hill tribe then took a new name, Mizo,  a poetic word for the Zomi. In 1933, Vum Thu Muang founded the Chin National Union. In 1944 the various groups, such as Sukte Independence Army were raised in Burma. In 1947 modern Burma was assembled from five countries, including Chin, Kachin, federated Shan state, Karen state and Burma according to the Panglong agreement. This agreement outlined each state's right to be self-administered after ten years from the date of agreement. However, the union of Burma was politically collapsing and the agreement fell apart. 

In 1960, the Chin Liberation Army was founded by Tun Kho Pum Baite to re-unify the Chin people while the Mizo National Front (MNF) strove for Mizo independence. MNF ended with the Mizoram state's creation by the Indian government. This movement did not cover all of Zogam. The Zomi Revolutionary Army was then created. Now the Hill people (Zomi) re-unification group is the Zomi Revolutionary Army.

The 8888 uprising took place in 1988. Students were protesting against the Burmese government. Zomi students were involved and founded the Chin National Army (CNA). The CNA continued its campaign against the Burmese government for about six months, until it was destroyed and many corpses were recovered from their camps. Some members went into hiding, while others founded small armed groups. The CNA was rejected by the Zomi National Congress.

After a few months, the CNA asked for a ceasefire agreement with the Burmese government.

References

Ethnic groups in Bangladesh
Ethnic groups in Manipur
Ethnic groups in Myanmar
Tribes of Assam